Beverley Marie Anderson-Brockway (born June 2, 1938) is a retired American alpine ski racer and a former member of the United States Ski Team. She competed in two events at the 1960 Winter Olympics.

Born in Ladysmith, Wisconsin, Anderson was raised in Mullan, Idaho, ski raced out of Lookout Pass, and attended the University of Washington in Seattle.

Olympic results

References

External links
 

1938 births
Living people
American female alpine skiers
Olympic alpine skiers of the United States
Alpine skiers at the 1960 Winter Olympics
People from Ladysmith, Wisconsin
People from Shoshone County, Idaho
Sportspeople from Idaho
Sportspeople from Wisconsin
University of Washington alumni
20th-century American women